Bulis is a genus of beetles. It may also refer to:
 Bulis (mythology), Greek mythological figure
 Bulis (Phocis), a town in Ancient Greece
 Bulis (surname)
 Curetis bulis, a species of butterfly

See also